is a video game developed and published by Tecmo for PlayStation in 1999.

Gameplay
Deception III expanded on the gameplay of Kagero by introducing a training mode, a mission mode, and trap enhancement through a series of crests and other artifacts. In the main story mode, players control Reina, a girl who, with her adoptive family, has been kidnapped and brought to the land of Burgenhagen to be sold into slavery. Reina must use the trapping powers she acquired to defeat her kidnappers and solve the mysteries of the pendant she wears, which other people seem to covet for unknown reasons.

The Free Training mode is simply a means of testing all of the available traps in a controlled environment with an immortal invader who can be programmed to adopt behavioral patterns, to learn their effects and uses without any real consequences. The mission mode, known as Expert Mode, assigns the player a given goal to achieve, usually within a time limit, with the traps available being any unlocked up to that point. Typical missions include "Crush the invader with a 4-hit combo" and "Make the killing hit a Pendulum trap". Also included is a Trap License mode which functions as a further tutorial, asking the player to perform various tasks that teach the nuances of the game in the name of learning helpful tips or trap functions. Traps are even more customizable than in previous games through the uses of Base Circles, Orbs, Emblems, and Rings. Base Circles contain the variety of trap involved (Pendulum, Arrow Slit, Bear Claw, etc.); Orbs determine the power level of the trap, ranging from 1 to 4; Emblems give the trap an element or special characteristic (Lightning, Fire, Slave, etc.); and Rings further enhance a trap by increasing their power, shortening their charge time, or a myriad number of other changes. The more modifications a trap employs, the more "Dreak" (the replacement for Kagero'''s Ark) it takes, but again, traps could be used infinitely upon creation. The loons from Kagero also returned as the sole means of regaining lost hit points. While not having secret traps, special emblems and rings can be acquired by achieving the game's four endings. Game saves are one block in size.

Reception

The game received above-average reviews according to the review aggregation website GameRankings. Eric Bratcher of NextGen called it "a creative niche title, worth checking out if you have a strong stomach and want something new." In Japan, Famitsu'' gave it a score of 31 out of 40.

Notes

References

External links
 

1999 video games
Dark fantasy video games
PlayStation (console) games
PlayStation Network games
Tactical role-playing video games
Tecmo games
Video game sequels
Video games developed in Japan
Video games scored by Hiroshi Miyazaki